Real Emotional Trash is the fourth album by Stephen Malkmus and the Jicks. The album was released on March 4, 2008 by Matador Records. The album was leaked on to the internet January 13, 2008. The album peaked #64 on the Billboard 200.

The album is the Jicks' first to feature Quasi and Sleater-Kinney drummer Janet Weiss.

The album was recorded at SnowGhost Music in Whitefish, Montana and  Wilco's Foxtrot Studio in Chicago, Illinois.

Track listing
 "Dragonfly Pie" - 5:08
 "Hopscotch Willie" - 6:56
 "Cold Son" - 3:43
 "Real Emotional Trash" - 10:09
 "Out of Reaches" - 4:51
 "Baltimore" - 6:37
 "Gardenia" - 2:54
 "Elmo Delmo" - 6:42
 "We Can't Help You" - 3:04
 "Wicked Wanda" - 5:06
Bonus tracks
"Walk Into the Mirror" - 3:39
 "Mr. Jolly" - 3:44

Personnel
Stephen Malkmus - guitar, vocals
Joanna Bolme - bass, background vocals, synthesizer
Janet Weiss - drums
Mike Clark - keyboards, guitar, synthesizer

Credits
Mixed by Nicolas Vernhes and The Jicks at the Rare Book Room, Brooklyn, New York
Recorded by TJ Doherty and Brett Allen (assistant)
Additional Recording by Sean Flora and Zach Okun

Album covers
There are several cover designs, all using the same image, but with differences in the artist / band name (using different colours). Examples are STEPHEN MALKMUS & JICKS (with white and/or blue text), SM & JICKS , and MALKMUS & JICKS .

References

Stephen Malkmus albums
2008 albums
Matador Records albums
Domino Recording Company albums